NorthernBlues Music is a Canadian independent record label, which specializes in blues music. The label was established in 2001, and a number of its artists and albums have since been nominated for and won Blues Music Awards. President Fred Litwin founded the company to "add substantially to the blues repertoire" with interesting, original music.

Artists
Carlos del Junco
Doug Cox
Eddie Turner
Homemade Jamz Blues Band
JW-Jones Blues Band
Mem Shannon
Moreland and Arbuckle
Paul Reddick
Samuel James
The Twisters
Watermelon Slim
Zac Harmon

Releases

See also
 List of record labels

References

External links
 NorthernBlues Music Official Site

Canadian independent record labels
Blues record labels
Record labels established in 2001